The 32nd CARIFTA Games were held in the Hasely Crawford National Stadium in Port of Spain, Trinidad and Tobago on April 19–21, 2003. A detailed report on the results was given.

Participation (unofficial)

Detailed result lists can be found on the CFPI and the "World
Junior Athletics History" website.  An unofficial count yields
the number of about 427 athletes (219 junior (under-20) and 208 youth
(under-17)) from about 23 countries:  Anguilla (3), Antigua and Barbuda (15),
Aruba (4), Bahamas (64), Barbados (21), Bermuda (7), British Virgin Islands
(7), Cayman Islands (13), Dominica (4), French Guiana (2), Grenada (47),
Guadeloupe (20), Guyana (15), Haiti (7), Jamaica (70), Martinique (19),
Netherlands Antilles (15), Saint Kitts and Nevis (6), Saint Lucia (8), Saint
Vincent and the Grenadines (5), Trinidad and Tobago (66), Turks and Caicos
Islands (8), US Virgin Islands (1).

Records

A total of 14 games records were set.

In the boys' U-20 category, Usain Bolt from Jamaica set three new games
records finishing the 200 metres in 20.43s (wind: -1.1 m/s), the 400 metres in
46.35s, and together with the Jamaican 4 × 100 m relay team in 39.43s.  In triple
jump, Ayata Joseph from Antigua and Barbuda set a new mark of 16.20
metres.  In shot put, Jamaican Kimani Kirton achieved 17.33 metres.  In
the discus throw competition, the old mark of 50.41 metres by Jamaican 
Dwayne Henclewood from the year 2000 was improved 
three times.  First, Kimani Kirton from Jamaica threw 51.25 metres in his 
second attempt.  Then, Eric Mathias from the British Virgin Islands 
reached 51.43 metres in his fifth attempt, before setting the final mark of 
55.20 metres in the last attempt.

In the girls' U-20 category, Camile Robinson from Jamaica finished the 400
metres hurdles in 56.61 seconds.  The Jamaican 4x400 metres relay team set
the new record to 3:36.20.  Peaches Roach from Jamaica and
Levern Spencer from Saint Lucia jumped 1.86 metres high.

In the boys' U-17 category, Romaine Gordon from Jamaica won the 100 metres hurdles in the new record time of 13.12s (wind: (-1.8 m/s).

Finally, in the girls' U-17 category, Kimberly Williams from Jamaica set the new record in triple jump of 12.18 metres (wind: 0.3 m/s), and the Jamaican
4x400 metres team achieved 3:39.50.

Austin Sealy Award

The Austin Sealy Trophy for the
most outstanding athlete of the games was awarded to Usain Bolt
from Jamaica.  He won 4 gold medals (200m, 400m, 4 × 100 m relay, and 4 × 400 m relay) in
the junior (U-20) category, achieving three new games records.

Medal summary
Medal winners are published by category: Boys under 20 (Junior), Girls under 20 (Junior), Boys under 17 (Youth), and Girls under 17 (Youth).
Complete results can be found on the CFPI and the "World Junior Athletics History"
website.

Boys under 20 (Junior)

: Open event for both junior and youth athletes.

Girls under 20 (Junior)

: Open event for both junior and youth athletes.

Boys under 17 (Youth)

Girls under 17 (Youth)

Medal table

The medal count has been published.  It is in agreement with an unofficial medal count.

References

External links
Games results by CFPI Timing
World Junior Athletics History

CARIFTA Games
2003 in Trinidad and Tobago sport
CARIFTA
2003 in Caribbean sport
International athletics competitions hosted by Trinidad and Tobago